A by-election for the United Kingdom House of Commons was held in the constituency of Nuneaton on 21 January 1965, following the creation of a vacancy by the granting of a Life Peerage to the sitting Labour Member of Parliament (MP) Frank Bowles.

Background
Following the Labour victory in the 1964 general election, new Prime Minister Harold Wilson appointed the General Secretary of the powerful Transport and General Workers' Union, Frank Cousins, as Minister of Technology. Since Cousins was not a Member of Parliament, attempts were made to find him a seat. Bowles volunteered to accept a Peerage to make way for him in what was considered a safe seat, with a majority of over 11,000.  He told the press he had initially been "shocked, tremendously worried and ill" at the thought of leaving the Commons, but decided to make the sacrifice.

Results

Previous result

See also
Nuneaton constituency
Lists of United Kingdom by-elections
List of United Kingdom by-elections (1950-1979)

References

By-elections to the Parliament of the United Kingdom in Warwickshire constituencies
1965 elections in the United Kingdom
1965 in England
20th century in Warwickshire
Nuneaton